Lower Wong Tai Sin Estate is a public housing estate and Tenants Purchase Scheme estate in Wong Tai Sin, Kowloon, Hong Kong, along the south of Lung Cheung Road, near Wong Tai Sin Temple and MTR Wong Tai Sin station. It is divided into Lower Wong Tai Sin (I) Estate and Lower Wong Tai Sin (II) Estate. After redevelopment, the estate consists of a total of 24 blocks built between the 1980s and 1990s.

Background
Lower Wong Tai Sin Estate was formerly a resettlement estate, called Wong Tai Sin Resettlement Estate. It had 29 blocks built between the 1950s and 1960s with a total population of 97,000 at that time. In 1973, the estate was renamed as Lower Wong Tai Sin Estate. In 1980, Block 8 was reassigned to Upper Wong Tai Sin Estate and was renamed "Cheung Yan House". Between the 1980s and 1990s, all old blocks were demolished to reconstruct new blocks. In 2001, some of the flats in Lower Wong Tai Sin (I) Estate were sold to tenants through Tenants Purchase Scheme Phase 4.

Houses

Lower Wong Tai Sin (I) Estate

Lower Wong Tai Sin (II) Estate

Others
Upper Wong Tai Sin Estate

References

Residential buildings completed in the 20th century
Public housing estates in Hong Kong
Tenants Purchase Scheme
Wong Tai Sin District
Chuk Yuen